Nikolai Ivanovich Fiyev (born 7 May 1982) is a former Russian professional football player.

Club career
He played three seasons in the Russian Football National League for FC Mashuk-KMV Pyatigorsk and FC Zhemchuzhina-Sochi.

Personal life
He is the twin brother of Vasili Fiyev.

References

External links
 

1982 births
Twin sportspeople
Russian twins
Living people
Russian footballers
Association football midfielders
FC Dynamo Stavropol players
FC Chernomorets Novorossiysk players
FC Zhemchuzhina Sochi players
FC Rotor Volgograd players
FC Mashuk-KMV Pyatigorsk players